MV St. Thomas Aquinas was a Philippine-registered passenger ferry operated by 2GO Travel. On 16 August 2013, the vessel collided with a cargo ship named MV Sulpicio Express Siete of Philippine Span Asia Carrier Corporation (formerly Sulpicio Lines) causing it to sink. As of 3 September 2013, there were 108 dead and 29 missing with 733 rescued as a result of the accident.

Service history

The ferry was named after the Catholic Saint Thomas Aquinas. The ferry was capable of transporting both passengers and wheeled cargo such as vehicles over a large body of water. 

It was launched and originally operated in 1973 by Meimon Car Ferry (later as Meimon Taiyo Ferry) as Ferry Sumiyoshi. It was later sold to Aboitiz Transport System (ATS) in the early 1990s for their SuperFerry line. She was renamed as M/V SuperFerry 2. The ferry was renamed the M/V St. Thomas Aquinas as a result of the ATS and Negros Navigation merger. The ship and her sister-ship M/V St. Joan of Arc (ex-Superferry 5/Ferry Hakozaki) were around 40 years old at the time of the sinking, making her one of the longest-serving Philippine-based passenger ships.

Sinking

Collision
On Friday, 16 August 2013, St. Thomas Aquinas departed from Nasipit, Agusan del Norte, on the southern Philippine island of Mindanao.

St. Thomas Aquinas immediately began to take on water, prompting the captain to order an "Abandon Ship" announcement. The crew hurriedly handed out life jackets as hundreds of passengers jumped overboard. Within 30 minutes, the ship sank.

At the time of the collision, St. Thomas Aquinas was carrying 715 passengers (58 were infants) and 116 crew members. Many passengers were asleep at the time or otherwise had trouble finding their way to the deck in the dark. A spokesperson for 2Go said there was a high probability that some passengers were in the area of impact and were trapped by the damage. The Sulpicio Express Siete, which did not sink, had 36 crew members on board and was severely damaged at the bow in the accident.

Local fishermen saw several flares–a sign of distress–being launched from St. Thomas Aquinas and helped with initial rescue efforts. "We just picked up the survivors and left the dead in the water," said a rescuer. "I heard screams and crying." The National Disaster Risk Reduction and Management Council (NDRRMC) conducted rescue efforts. Rescued passengers were taken to local hotels.

Casualties
On Saturday, 17 August 2013, divers began the process of recovering bodies from the ship, which lay in 30 metres of water, but suspended operations later in the day due to safety concerns. 31 people were confirmed dead with 172 others missing as of midday, when rescue operations were suspended due to rough seas.
By 18 August, there were 35 confirmed deaths and 85 others missing as a result of the accident. On 19 August, the Coast Guard confirmed 55 dead and 65 missing with 750 rescued. Rescue and recovery efforts were hampered by bad weather.

Many of the survivors were sickened after swallowing seawater and oil believed to have leaked from St. Thomas Aquinas.

Cause
In a statement, 2Go said St. Thomas Aquinas "was reportedly hit" by Sulpicio Line's cargo vessel, but at the same time refused to directly blame the cargo vessel. 2Go said the Port of Cebu is unusually narrow and that special traffic control measures were in use to try to avoid accidents at the port.

Maritime accidents in the Philippines are common due to a combination of bad weather, poor maintenance, and lax enforcement of safety regulations. The Philippine Span Asia Carrier Corporation (operator of Sulpicio Lines) has been involved in five maritime disasters, most notably the 1987 sinking of the ferry Doña Paz that resulted in an estimated 4,000+ deaths.

Official investigation
A Special Board of Marine Inquiry was opened on 23 August in Cebu City, led by Commodore Gilbert Rueras of the Philippine Coast Guard. The captains of the MV St Thomas Aquinas and the Sulpicio Express Siete testified, as did Captain Galipher Ian Faller, captain of a Trans-Asia Shipping Lines cargo ship in the area, the Trans Asia Nine. Captain Galipher of the Trans Asia Nine testified that the Sulpicio Line Siete was in the inbound lane instead of the outbound lane.

Long-term implications
Oil and fuel are leaking from the shipwreck. Owner 2Go used spill-containment equipment in the area, but local fishing was affected. The spilled petroleum is expected to contaminate local beaches and mangrove swamps, further damaging Cebu's ecosystem and economy.

See also
 List of maritime disasters involving the Philippine Span Asia Carrier Corporation
 List of maritime disasters in the Philippines
 List of shipwrecks in 2013

References 

1972 ships
2013 in the Philippines
Ferries of the Philippines
Maritime incidents in 2013
Maritime incidents in the Philippines
Ships sunk in collisions
Shipwrecks in the Pacific Ocean
History of Cebu City